Nicholas X. Duran is a Democratic member of the Florida Legislature representing the state's 112th House district, which includes part of Miami-Dade County.

Florida House of Representatives
Duran defeated Waldo Faura-Morales in the August 30, 2016 Democratic primary, winning 71.9% of the vote. In the November 8, 2016 general election, Duran won 53.3% of the vote, defeating Republican Rosa Maria "Rosy" Palomino.

Duran was reelected in the November 6, 2018 general election, again defeating Palomino, this time with 57.55% of the vote.

References

1981 births
Living people
People from Pompano Beach, Florida
University of Florida alumni
New York Law School alumni
Democratic Party members of the Florida House of Representatives
21st-century American politicians